Brian J. Frederick is a cultural/queer criminologist and Assistant Professor of Criminal Justice at SUNY Empire State College in Brooklyn.

Biography
In 2016, Dr. Frederick completed an Erasmus Mundus Joint Doctorate in Global and Cultural Criminology (DCGC) programme at the School of Social Policy, Sociology & Social Research (SSPSSR) at the University of Kent (Canterbury, England) and the Institute für Kriminologische Sozialforschung (IKS) at university of Hamburg (Hamburg, Germany) their degree (and the wider DCGC scheme) was funded through the European Union's Education Audiovisual and Culture Executive Agency. Their research focuses on how ongoing commercialisation, commodification and gentrification of gay/queer physical space (i.e., ‘gay ghettos’) and gay/queer virtual space has led to the emergence of counter-homonormative, counter-cultural virtual spaces (e.g., online bulletin boards, social networking services, web-based social networking applications) which are used to facilitate the sharing of drug-related sexual experiences (e.g., 'barebacking', 'party 'n' play'/'chemsex') among gay, bisexual and queer men (GBQM). Their research also looks at the impact of criminal justice and public health interventions, as well as the stigmatisation, marginalisation and oppression of GBQM by contemporary gay culture, specifically, as well as by the gay rights movement, generally —- a subject that has received little attention among academic researchers.

Dr. Frederick's research is unique because it applies a queered cultural criminological lens to the study of crime and crime control-related issues that impact the lived experiences of lesbian, gay, bisexual, transgender and queer (LGBTQ) individuals. Several areas in which they are actively researching include: 

 Intimate partner violence (IPV) and intimate partner homicide (IPH) in same-sex relationships and in relationships where transgender individuals are victims
 Serial murder involving gay, bisexual and queer male victims and perpetrators
 Queer male drug use.
 Critical criminological pedagogy

Finally, Dr. Frederick's research takes a critical stance towards current criminal justice policies and public health strategies that target gay, bisexual, and queer male drug users and advocates instead for decriminalisation and a non-interventionist, non-stigmatising, 'zero-discrimination' approach by service providers.

Media appearances
Dr. Frederick is a subject-matter expert on numerous episodes of Meet, Marry, Murder, which launched on the True Crime Network (U.S.) and the Crime & Investigation network (U.K.) in Spring 2021. The series is produced by Will Hanrahan of U.K.-based FirstLookTV. He also features as a regularly-appearing subject matter expert on Making a Serial Killer, a U.S. television series that profiles North American serial killers such as Roland Dominique, Bruce MacArthur and Anthony Shore; the series launched on Amazon Prime and Apple TV in January 2022.

Additionally, Dr. Frederick has made numerous media appearances at the local, regional and national level on topics such as American politics, the U.S. criminal justice system, the 'Dark Web', U.K. knife crime, psychopathy and the Salisbury poisonings, to name a few.

See also
 Pink capitalism

References

Publications 
Frederick, Brian Jay (in print). Mediated representations of queer male drug use. Salud & Sociedad.
Suguira, L., Button, M., Tapley, J. Blackbourn, D, Frederick, B.J. & Hawkins, C.D. Computer misuse as a facilitator of domestic abuse. U.K. Home Office
Frederick, Brian Jay (2016). Exploring the (Sub)Cultural Aspects of Gay, Bisexual and Queer Male Drug Use in Cyberspace. Doctor of Philosophy [PhD] Thesis. University of Kent, University of Hamburg.
Thanki, D. & Frederick, B. (2016). 'Social media and drug markets', The internet and drug markets (European Monitoring Centre for Drugs and Drug Addiction: Insights 21), Publications Office of the European Union, Luxembourg.
Frederick, B.J. & Gil Larruscahim, P. (2016). Cultural criminology. In W.G. Jennings [Ed.] The Wiley Encyclopedia of Crime & Punishment (p. 1). Hoboken, NJ: John Wiley & Sons.
Frederick, B.J. & Perrone, D. (2014). "'Party N Play' on the Internet: Subcultural formation, Craigslist, and escaping from stigma." Deviant Behavior 35: 859-884.
Frederick, B.J. (2013). "Delinquent boys": Toward a new understanding of "deviant" and transgressive behavior in gay men. Critical Criminology, 21(4):10.1007/s10612-013-9230-3
Frederick, B. J. (2012). The marginalization of critical perspectives in public criminal justice core curricula. Western Criminological Review, 13(3), 21-33.
The Risks of Using Gay & MSM "Hookup" Technologies
Frederick, B., & Fradella, H. (2012). Leopold and Loeb. In Wilbur R. Miller (Ed.), The social history of crime and punishment in America: An encyclopedia. (pp. 1005-1006). Thousand Oaks, CA: SAGE Publications, Inc. doi: 10.4135/9781452218427.n394

Further reading 
Ball, M. (2013). Queer Criminology, Critique, and the "Art of Not Being Governed". Critical Criminology, 1-14.
Ball, M. (2014). What's Queer About Queer Criminology?. In Handbook of LGBT communities, crime, and justice (pp. 531–555). Springer New York.
Buist, C. L., & Stone, C. (2013). Transgender Victims and Offenders: Failures of the United States Criminal Justice System and the Necessity of Queer Criminology. Critical Criminology, 1-13.
Panfil, V. R. (2013). Better left unsaid? The role of agency in queer criminological research. Critical Criminology, 1-13.
Woods, J.B. (2013). Queer Contestations and the Future of a Critical “Queer” Criminology. Critical Criminology, 1-15.

External links 
Dr Brian Frederick, University of Portsmouth Research Portal
Brian Frederick, DCGC candidate bio
DCGC – Doctorate in Cultural and Global Criminology | PhD Programme in Criminology

American criminologists
Living people
Academics of the University of Kent
Year of birth missing (living people)